This is a list of National Historic Landmarks in the U.S. state of Wisconsin. National Historic Landmarks are designated by the U.S. National Park Service, which recognizes buildings, structures, districts, objects, and sites which satisfy certain criteria for historic significance. There are 44 National Historic Landmarks in Wisconsin.

Current landmarks

|}

See also

 National Register of Historic Places listings in Wisconsin
 List of U.S. National Historic Landmarks by state

References

External links

 National Register Information System, National Park Service.

Wisconsin
 
National Historic Landmarks
National Historic Landmarks